If You Love This Planet is a 1982 short documentary film directed by Terre Nash and produced by Edward Le Lorrain for the National Film Board of Canada's women's studio, Studio D. It is one of the definitive films of the peace movement.

Plot
The film is a recording of a lecture given to SUNY Plattsburgh students by Australian physician and anti-nuclear activist Dr. Helen Caldicott about the dangers posed by nuclear weapons. While Caldicott speaks about the dangers of nuclear war and what it could mean in terms of casualties, Nash cuts from the speech to black-and-white images of the bombings of Hiroshima and Nagasaki.

Production
The film was created by Studio D with a budget of $70,117. The NFB's Board of Governors stated that the film was the "hottest film since Not a Love Story". The Ministry of External Affairs opposed including Ronald Reagan in the film.

Release
The film was meant to be shown at the United Nations's Conference on Disarmament. It debuted in the United Kingdom when it was screened by the London Socialist Film Co-op. The Canadian Broadcasting Corporation declined to broadcast the film, "because it takes a strong position on nuclear arms and does not give a balanced and objective view of the subject", and that they could not counter the film as it would be difficult to assemble a discussion panel including supporters of nuclear war. The film was later shown on the CBC newsmagazine The Journal.  The film received positive reviews from the Los Angeles Times, East Bay Express, and The Seattle Times, and praise from activist and filmmaker Naomi Klein.

Reaction of the Reagan administration
Released during the term of the Reagan administration and at the height of Cold War nuclear tensions between the United States and Soviet Union, If You Love This Planet was officially designated as "foreign political propaganda" by the United States Department of Justice and temporarily banned. The subsequent uproar over that action gave the film a publicity boost; it won the 1983 Academy Award for Best Documentary (Short Subject). In her Oscar acceptance speech, Nash thanked the Reagan administration for the added publicity.

On 13 January 1983, the American distributors of If You Love This Planet, Acid Rain: Requiem or Recovery, and Acid from Heaven were ordered to register as foreign agents by the United States Department of Justice citing the Foreign Agents Registration Act. The films were also ordered to be labeled as political propaganda. Barry Keene, a member of the California State Senate, filed a lawsuit against the order. In 1983, an injunction against the DOJ was issued by U.S. District Judge Raul Anthony Ramirez. In 1986, the Supreme Court of the United States agreed to hear the case; on 28 April 1987, in Meese v. Keene, it ruled five to three in favor of the DOJ.

Legacy
In 1992, Caldicott published the book, If You Love This Planet: A Plan to Heal the Earth and, from July 2008 to November 2012, hosted a weekly radio program called If You Love This Planet.

Awards
 DOK Leipzig, Leipzig: Special Award given by the World Peace Council, 1982
 Yorkton Film Festival, Yorkton: Certificate of Merit, 1982
 American Film and Video Festival, New York: Blue Ribbon, Nuclear Issues, 1983
 Melbourne International Film Festival, Melbourne: Silver Boomerang, Second Prize, 1983
 ATOM Awards, Melbourne: Commendation, 1983
 International Scientific Film Festival, Rio de Janeiro: Best Communications Prize, 1984
 55th Academy Awards, Los Angeles: Best Documentary Short, 1983

See also
Eight Minutes to Midnight: A Portrait of Dr. Helen Caldicott, a 1981 feature-length documentary film

References

Works cited

External links

Watch If You Love this Planet at NFB.ca

If You Love This Planet Radio Program
Full film at Documentary.net

1982 films
1982 in the environment
English-language Canadian films
National Film Board of Canada documentaries
Best Documentary Short Subject Academy Award winners
Documentary films about nuclear war and weapons
Canadian short documentary films
1982 documentary films
Anti–nuclear weapons movement
Anti-nuclear films
Films about activists
National Film Board of Canada short films
Quebec films
1980s English-language films
Film censorship in the United States
Films about the atomic bombings of Hiroshima and Nagasaki
1980s Canadian films
1980s short documentary films